The Sukhumvit line or Light Green line, is an elevated metro rail line of the BTS Skytrain in Bangkok, Thailand. From the central Siam Station, where it connects with the Silom Line, the line runs both northwards along Phaya Thai and Phahon Yothin Roads to Khu Khot in Lam Luk Ka District in Pathum Thani, and eastwards along Rama I, Phloen Chit and Sukhumvit Roads, through Bang Na District to Kheha Station in Samut Prakan. BTS daily ridership (2019) is 740,000 passengers per day.

History 
The first part of the line opened in December 1999 and consisted of seventeen stations from Mo Chit to On Nut. Currently, there are 47 stations in operation for more than 50 km from origin to destination. Its formal name is The Elevated Train in Commemoration of HM the King's 6th Cycle Birthday 1st line.

Stations
A planned station at N6 has never been built.

Services 
BTS operates services throughout the line from Khu Khot to Kheha at all times. At peak hours between 07.00-09.00 and 16.00-20.00, some "short-run" services run terminate at Mo Chit and Kasetsart University northbound, and at Samrong, eastbound. Trains run generally at three to six-minute intervals. The last eastbound trains from Khu Khot terminate at Kheha, Samrong or Ha Yaek Lat Phrao. The last northbound trains from Kheha terminate at Khu Khot, Mo Chit, or Samrong.

A few off-peak eastbound trains run a through service on the Silom Line to Bang Wa, in order to increase the line capacity at peak hours. At night, these trains will run back northbound and head to depot. Some late northbound trains on the Silom line switch to the Sukhumvit line at Siam to reach the depot at Mo Chit.

Extensions and current construction

Summary of BTS Sukhumvit extensions
 12 August 2011: On Nut (E09) – Bearing (E14)
 3 April 2017: Bearing (E14) – Samrong (E15)
 6 December 2018: Samrong (E15) – Kheha (E23)
 9 August 2019: Mo Chit (N8) – Ha Yaek Lat Phrao (N9)
 4 December 2019: Ha Yaek Lat Phrao (N9) – Kasetsart University (N13)
 5 June 2020: Kasetsart University (N13) – Wat Phra Sri Mahathat (N17)
 16 December 2020 Wat Phra Sri Mahathat (N17) – Khu Khot (N24).

East
1st extension to Bearing 
Construction started in August 2006 on a four billion baht, 5.25 km extension from On Nut (E9) to Bearing. The extension was funded by the BMA. The original scheduled opening date was mid-2009. However, a delay in tendering of the contract for the electrical and signalling works resulted in a two-year delay.

The extension did not open until over two years later, on 12 August 2011. The delay in opening prompted the BMA to offer free travel for this extension until the end of 2011 as compensation. An additional flat fee is charged additionally to the distance-based fare of the rest of the BTS network.

2nd extension to Kheha Construction started in April 2012 on a 12.6 km, nine station extension from Bearing station to Kheha station. The extension was funded by the MRTA as it is outside BMA city limits, Bangkok Province. Construction was contracted to take 1,350 days and the extension was originally scheduled to open by early 2017.  In April 2013, the MRTA awarded Ch Karnchang the contract for track laying and electrical systems.

In June 2014, civil works were stated to be 28.3 percent complete. In August 2016, the BMA agreed to take over the operation of the extension from MRTA. Delays over the agreement of how much the BMA should pay MRTA caused a delay in the commencement of test runs on the extension. Track works were 98% completed by November 2016. The total cost of the extension was estimated at 21.4 billion baht. In January 2017, it was announced that the opening of the extension could be further delayed to 2018-2019 due to budgetary concerns and ongoing disputes between the MRTA and BMA.

The first 1.2 km section of the extension to Samrong station (E15) opened on 3 April 2017. The full extension to Kheha opened on 6 December 2018.

North

1st and 2nd extension
1) Mo Chit station to Saphan Mai: 11.4 km, 12 stations (N9–N20)
2) Saphan Mai to Khu Khot: 7.5 km, four stations (N21-N24)

An 11.4 km, 11 station northern extension from Mo Chit station to Saphan Mai in Don Mueang District had been planned since the Sukhumvit line opened. Originally, this extension was scheduled to be completed by 2008. However, due to a combination of changes in government, a prolonged environmental study, and problems with locating a suitable train depot the extension was continually delayed. A further 16.5 km, nine station extension from Saphan Mai to Khu Khot was also planned once the extension to Saphan Mai had been completed.

After multiple delays, in mid-2013 a decision was made to tender extensions (1) and (2) at the same time, by the end of 2013. However, the dissolution of parliament in November 2013 delayed this yet again. A tender was finally released in January 2014 with an April deadline before being delayed until late May 2014 due to concerns from bidders. A military coup in late-May 2014 suspended the bidding process whilst the military administration reviewed all major projects. In late June, the military administration affirmed that the tender would proceed before the end of 2014. In August 2014, the MRTA announced that the new tender deadline was 30 September 2014. Five bidders qualified and the successful bids were announced in December 2014. The tender specified a construction period of 1,350 days.

On 3 April 2015, MRTA signed four contracts for this extension:
 Contract 1: Civil works of 11.4 km from Mo Chit to Saphan Mai, will be constructed by Italian-Thai Development (15,269 million baht)
 Contract 2: Civil works of 7.5 km from Saphan Mai to Khu Khot, will be constructed by UN-SH-CH joint venture (6,657 million baht)
 Contract 3: Civil works of Depot and Park and Ride building, will be constructed by STEC-AS joint venture (4,019 million baht)
 Contract 4: Tracklaying and system design, will be constructed by STEC-AS joint venture (2,841 million baht)

The MRTA, contactors and Thai Traffic Police met on 2 September 2015 and confirmed construction would begin on 8 September 2015. A flyover at Kasetsart was demolished, which commenced on 12 September 2015.

At 31 December 2017, the progress of civil works construction was at 53.31% according to the MRTA. As of the end of April 2018, the MRTA stated that civil works progress had advanced to 63.27%. As of 30 September, overall construction had progressed to 78.79%. By the end of March 2019, civil construction had nearly been completed having progressed to 99.42%.

Testing of the final 9.8 km, 7 station section from Wat Phra Sri Mahathat (N17) to Khu Khot (N24) began on 5 October and will continue until the full extension opens. The final section will be officially opened on 16 December 2020 by the Prime Minister.

Opening dates

 The first section to Ha Yaek Lat Phrao station (N9) opened on 9 August 2019.
 The next 4 stations from a Yaek Lat Phrao station (N9) to Kasetsart University (N13) opened on 4 December 2019.
 The next 4 stations from Kasetsart University (N13) to Wat Phra Sri Mahathat (N17) opened on 5 June 2020.
 The remaining section of 9.8 km and 7 stations from Wat Phra Sri Mahathat (N17) to Khu Khot (N24) opened on 16 December 2020.

Future extension plans
East:
 A further 7 km, four station extension from Kheha station to Bang Pu station is planned.

North:
 A further 9 km, four station extension east along Lam Lukka Road from Khu Khot station to Wongwaen-Lam Luk Ka station is planned.

See also
 Mass Rapid Transit Master Plan in Bangkok Metropolitan Region
 BTS Skytrain
 Silom Line
 MRT (Bangkok)
 MRT Brown Line
 MRT Blue Line
 MRT Grey Line
 MRT Light Blue Line
 MRT Orange Line
 MRT Pink Line
 MRT Purple Line
 MRT Yellow Line
 AERA1 City
 SRT Dark Red Line
 SRT Light Red Line
 BMA Gold Line
 Bangkok BRT

References

BTS Skytrain lines
Railway lines opened in 1999
1999 establishments in Thailand